Ivar Mølgaard is a Danish lightweight rower. He won a gold medal at the 1981 World Rowing Championships in Munich with the lightweight men's eight.

References

Year of birth missing (living people)
Danish male rowers
World Rowing Championships medalists for Denmark
Living people